Erlend Loe (24 May 1969, Trondheim) is a Norwegian novelist, screenwriter and film critic. Loe writes both children's and adult literature. He has gained popularity in Scandinavia with his humorous and sometimes naïve novels, although his stories have become darker in tone, moving towards a more satirical criticism of modern Norwegian society.

Biography

Erlend Loe worked at a psychiatric clinic, as a substitute teacher and as a freelance journalist for Norwegian newspaper Adresseavisen. Loe now lives and works in Oslo where in 1998 he co-founded Screenwriters Oslo - an office community for screenwriters.

His first book Tatt av kvinnen (Gone with the Woman) was published in 1993, and a year later published a children's book, Fisken (The Fish), about a forklift operator named Kurt. Loe has a distinctive style of writing which is often likened to naïve art. He often uses irony, exaggeration and humor. His children's books are illustrated by Kim Hiorthøy. Loe has recorded many of his books as Norwegian audiobooks.

His popular novel Naiv. Super. (Naïve. Super.) has been translated into over 20 languages including English.

Bibliography

Novels

(English title only mentioned if English translation has been published.)

 Tatt av kvinnen (1993)
 Naïve. Super (Naive.Super.) (1996)
 L (1999)
 Fakta om Finland (2001)
 Doppler (Doppler) (2004)
 Volvo lastvagnar (Volvo Trucks) (2005)
 Muleum (Muleum) (2007)
 Stille dager i Mixing Part (Lazy Days) (2009)
 Fvonk (2011)
 Vareopptelling (2013; English: tallying the inventory)
 Slutten på verden slik vi kjenner den (2015)
 Dyrene I Afrika (2018)
 Helvete (2019)
 Forhandle med virkeligheten: Ett år på ett hjul (2020)

Other works
 Fisken (1994), Children's book
 Maria & José (1994), picture book
 Kurt blir grusom (1995), children's book, also adapted into an animated film
 Den store røde hunden (1996), children's book
 Kurt quo vadis? (1998), children's book
 Detektor (2000), film script
 Jotunheimen, bill.mrk. 2469 (2001), text to photographs by Bård Løken
 Klatretøsen (2002), film script
 Kurt koker hodet (2003), play, also adapted into a children's book
 Pingvinhjelpen (2006), play
 Organisten (2006), with Petter Amundsen, non-fiction
 The Mischievous Russ/Den Fæle Russen" short story in Jørn Tomter's photography book The Norwegian Way
 Kurtby (2008), children's book
 North (2009), screenplay
 Kurt kurér (2010), children's book
 En helt vanlig dag på jobben (2010), screenplay
 Fruit Delivery (short) (2012), original screenplay
 Fisken och apelsinen (short) (2012), original screenplay
 Bara sex (short) (2012), screenplay

 Awards 
1997: Cappelen Prize
1999: Norwegian Booksellers' Prize for L''
2013: Aschehoug Prize

References

External links
 Nordic Council Film Prize 2009

1969 births
Living people
Norwegian children's writers
20th-century Norwegian novelists
21st-century Norwegian novelists
Norwegian dramatists and playwrights